A continuous game is a mathematical concept, used in game theory, that generalizes the idea of an ordinary game like tic-tac-toe (noughts and crosses) or checkers (draughts). In other words, it extends the notion of a discrete game, where the players choose from a finite set of pure strategies. The continuous game concepts allows games to include more general sets of pure strategies, which may be uncountably infinite. 

In general, a game with uncountably infinite strategy sets will not necessarily have a Nash equilibrium solution. If, however, the strategy sets are required to be compact and the utility functions continuous, then a Nash equilibrium will be guaranteed; this is by Glicksberg's generalization of the Kakutani fixed point theorem. The class of continuous games is for this reason usually defined and studied as a subset of the larger class of infinite games (i.e. games with infinite strategy sets) in which the strategy sets are compact and the utility functions continuous.

Formal definition
Define the n-player continuous game  where

 is the set of   players,
  where each  is a compact set, in a metric space, corresponding to the  th player's set of pure strategies,
  where  is the utility function of player 
 Define the strategy profile  where 
Let  be a strategy profile of all players except for player .  As with discrete games, we can define a best response correspondence for player , .   is a relation from the set of all probability distributions over opponent player profiles to a set of player 's strategies, such that each element of

Define

.
A strategy profile  is a Nash equilibrium if and only if

The existence of a Nash equilibrium for any continuous game with continuous utility functions can be proven using  Irving Glicksberg's generalization of the Kakutani fixed point theorem.  In general, there may not be a solution if we allow strategy spaces, 's which are not compact, or if we allow non-continuous utility functions.

Separable games
A separable game is a continuous game where, for any i, the utility function  can be expressed in the sum-of-products form:

In general, mixed Nash equilibria of separable games are easier to compute than non-separable games as implied by the following theorem:
For any separable game there exists at least one Nash equilibrium where player i mixes at most  pure strategies.
Whereas an equilibrium strategy for a non-separable game may require an uncountably infinite support, a separable game is guaranteed to have at least one Nash equilibrium with finitely supported mixed strategies.

Examples

Separable games

A polynomial game
Define the utility functions  where

.

The pure strategy best response relations are:

  and    do not intersect, so there is no pure strategy Nash equilibrium.
However, there should be a mixed strategy equilibrium.  To find it, express the expected value,  as a linear combination of the first and second moments of the probability distributions of X and Y:

 

(where  and similarly for Y).

 

Each pair of constraints defines a compact convex subset in the plane.  Since  is linear, any extrema with respect to a player's first two moments will lie on the boundary of this subset.  Player i's equilibrium strategy will lie on

 

Note that the first equation only permits mixtures of 0 and 1 whereas the second equation only permits pure strategies.
However  gives both 0 and 1 when y = 1/2.
A Nash equilibrium exists when:

 

This determines one unique equilibrium where Player X plays a random mixture of 0 for 1/2 of the time and 1 the other 1/2 of the time.  Player Y plays the pure strategy of 1/2.  The value of the game is 1/4.

Non-Separable Games

A rational pay-off function
Define the utility functions  where

This game has no pure strategy Nash equilibrium.  It can be shown that a unique mixed strategy Nash equilibrium exists with the following pair of probability density functions:

 

Requiring a Cantor distribution
Define the utility functions  where
.
This game has a unique mixed strategy equilibrium where each player plays a mixed strategy with the Cantor singular function as the cumulative distribution function.

Further reading
 H. W. Kuhn and A. W. Tucker, eds. (1950).  Contributions to the Theory of Games: Vol. II. Annals of Mathematics Studies 28.  Princeton University Press. .

See also
 Graph continuous

References

Game theory game classes